Girls & Horses is the third studio album from independent Nashville singer-songwriter, Templeton Thompson. The album was released on November 7, 2006 via Reve Records/Connected At The Hit Productions. Like Thompson's two previous album's, Girls & Horses  was also produced by Sam Gay.

Background 
The album was released during the fall of 2006. The album which includes ten songs, shows much of Thompson's passion for horses. Each song identifies or relates to the relationship formed between humans and their horses. Girls & Horses has been named Thompson's most personal record to date. Prior the release of the album, a promotional video clip was released to accompany the street release. A music video accompanied the title track's release as a single. The video features Thompson riding with her own horse with 'flashbacks' of a child who has carried a passion for horses from a young age, reflective of Thompson's own childhood.

Critical reception 
Journalist, "Lead Mare" of GirlsHorseClub.com praises Thompson's work on the album stating, " As the writer or co-writer of all but one of the tunes in this collection, she sings the *feeling* behind each song. Every track tells her story." Sue Kottwitz of the Talking Dogs blog exclaims, "Girls and Horses displays Templeton's true love for equine and speaks to the soul of every woman who ever loved a horse."

Track listing 

+"Wake Up Grateful" contains hidden bonus track.

References

2006 albums
Templeton Thompson albums